Pico Viejo is a volcano located on the island of Tenerife in Canary Islands, Spain. It is the second highest peak of Tenerife and the Canary Islands (after the Teide), with a height of 3,135 m above sea level, and a huge crater approximately 720 metres in diameter.

The volcano is part of the Teide volcanic complex, which began forming about 200,000 years ago in the center of Tenerife. Its crater is one of the satellite craters around El Teide.

It last erupted in 1798, and it is estimated that it ejected around 12 million m³ of lava over three months forming a black colored surface, which is different from the rest of the volcano area, which are known as the Teide noses.

Climbing routes
Pico Viejo can be climbed from several sides: from the road in the west and south-west, from the hotel Parador, and from Mount Teide.

The shortest approach from the west and south-west side is if you start from the parking Narices del Teide. From the Parador side, the route starts at the parking area.

See also 
 Mount Guajara
 Teide National Park

References 

 Geology of the Teide
 Pico Viejo - Route description on Mountains for Everybody.

External links

Teide National Park - Official Website of Tenerife Tourism Corporation

Mountains of the Canary Islands
Volcanoes of the Canary Islands
VEI-5 volcanoes
Active volcanoes
Stratovolcanoes
Hotspot volcanoes
Tenerife